Viennoiseries ("things of Vienna") are baked goods made from a yeast-leavened dough in a manner similar to bread, or from puff pastry, but with added ingredients (particularly eggs, butter, milk, cream and sugar), which give them a richer, sweeter character that approaches that of pastry. The dough is often laminated.

Viennoiseries are typically eaten at breakfast or as snacks.

Types
Examples include croissants; Vienna bread and its French equivalent, pain viennois, often shaped into baguettes; brioche; pain au chocolat; pain au lait; pain aux raisins; chouquettes; Danish pastries; xuixo; bugnes; and chausson aux pommes.

History
The popularity of Viennese-style baked goods in France began with the Boulangerie Viennoise, which was opened by August Zang in 1839. The first usage of the expression pâtisseries viennoises appeared in 1877 in a book by the French author Alphonse Daudet, Le Nabab. However, the use of puff pastry came later and is a method that is French, not Viennese.

Gallery

See also

 List of baked goods
 List of French desserts
 Beignet

References

French pastries
Sweet breads